The 1902 Carlisle Indians football team represented the Carlisle Indian Industrial School as an independent during the 1902 college football season. Led by fourth-year head coach Pop Warner, the Indians compiled a record of 8–3 and outscored opponents 251 to 51.

Schedule

References

Carlisle
Carlisle Indians football seasons
Carlisle Indians football